The 2022 Oklahoma State Treasurer election took place on November 8, 2022, to elect the next Oklahoma State Treasurer. The primary election is scheduled for Tuesday, June 28, 2022. Runoff primary elections, if necessary, would have been held on Tuesday, August 23, 2022. The deadline for candidates to file was April 15, 2022.

Incumbent Republican Party Treasurer Randy McDaniel did not seek re-election. Former state house representative and Republican nominee Todd Russ defeated Democratic nominee Charles De Coune and Libertarian nominee Gregory Sadler.

Republican primary

Candidates

Nominee
Todd Russ, former state representative from the 55th district (2009–2022)

Eliminated in runoff
Clark Jolley, former chair of the Oklahoma Tax Commission (2017–2021) and former state senator (2004–2016)

Eliminated in primary
David Hooten, Oklahoma County Clerk (2016–2022)

Withdrew
Mike Mazzei, former state senator (2004–2016)

Declined
Randy McDaniel, incumbent treasurer

Endorsements

Polling

Results

Runoff polling

Results

General election

Candidates
Todd Russ (Republican nominee)
Charles de Coune, candidate for Oklahoma County Court Clerk in 2020 and Independent candidate for State Treasurer in 2018 (Democratic nominee)
Gregory Sadler, candidate for the Oklahoma State Senate in 2020 (Libertarian nominee)

Endorsements

Polling

Results

Notes

References

External links
Official campaign websites
Clark Jolley (R) for State Treasurer
Todd Russ (R) for State Treasurer

State Treasurer
Oklahoma
Oklahoma State Treasurer elections